Nagi Ghazi Moursine (born 1963) is an Iraqi hurdler. He competed in the men's 110 metres hurdles at the 1988 Summer Olympics.

References

1963 births
Living people
Athletes (track and field) at the 1988 Summer Olympics
Iraqi male hurdlers
Olympic athletes of Iraq
Place of birth missing (living people)